A fisheries observer is an independent specialist who serves on board commercial fishing vessels, or in fish processing plants and other platforms, and is employed by a fisheries observer program, either directly by a government agency or by a third party contractor.  Observers spend anywhere from 1 day to 3 months out at sea before returning to be “debriefed”.  A debriefing consists of reviewing any unusual occurrences or observations, violations observed, and any safety problems or other hardships they endured during the trip.  These data are then integrated into the regional agency’s database used to monitor fish quotas.

Observers are usually the only independent data collection source for some types of at-sea information, such as bycatch, catch composition, and gear configuration data.  Independent data collection in this context refers to data that is not potentially biased by the fishermen.  Creel surveys, trip reports, and other data obtained directly from fishermen can have some dependent bias associated with it.  Fisheries-dependent information is critical for the responsible management and conservation of living marine resources, and many worldwide marine resource management regimes utilize fisheries observers for the collection of this data.

The integrity of a fisheries observer program is a function of the conduct, morale, and performance of its employees. Moreover, the stature and stability of a program has direct bearing on the quality of its data products and on the level of confidence that scientists, managers, and policy makers are able to ascribe to the use of this data.

Fisheries observer program

Hiring Requirements
A fisheries observer program is responsible for providing the training and support necessary for deploying observers on board fishing vessels in order to collect the fisheries-dependent information essential to achieving the management objectives of the programme.  Generally, fisheries observers are required to have an educational background in the biological sciences and a proven ability to handle life at sea. Specific programs have additional or less requirements. Also required is an independent attitude, an ability to get along with people in tight quarters and strong personal integrity. "Hang Loose" and "Stand By" are the general mottos for observers because conditions, boats and circumstances often change at the last minute.

Objectives
Fisheries observer programmes vary according to the management objective. The  three main objectives are

 Scientific: including stock (targeted and / or bycatch species) assessments and predictions of future fisheries exploitation of stocks. Observer duties include collection of catch composition and environmental / ecological information, and biological sampling of catch
 Monitoring control and surveillance (MCS): including assessments of fishing and / or transhipment activities to ensure fisheries management measures are followed. Observer duties include verification of logbooks with fishing and / or transhipment activities and registering compliance with all regulations.
 Fisheries: including the objectives found in both scientific and MCS observer programmes. Observer duties also include the observer duties found in both scientific and MCS observer programs.

The International Fisheries Observer and Monitoring Conference develops, promotes and enhances effective fishery monitoring programs to ensure sustainable resource management throughout the world’s oceans.  Their mission is to improve fishery monitoring and observing programs worldwide through sharing practices and development of data collection and analysis.  Since many observing entities are contracted, this conference allows dialog between agencies and between those that rely upon the data collected by observers.

http://www.apo-observers.org/programs gives a list of observer programs around the world.

NOAA National Observer Program (United States)

Mission
The mission of the National Observer Program is to provide a support system for observers ensuring that they are fully supported.  The policies must reflect the diverse needs of regional observer programs while enhancing data quality and achieving consistency in key areas of national importance.  Observers are fully assisted by the National Observer Program.  Most gear is provided to observers for safety and sampling. Travel mileage, hotels, and expenses are paid while traveling to and from docks.  Observers are also supported by extremely strict repercussions against any fisherman impeding or endangering them at the docks or while at sea.

Objectives
Coordinate the National Observer Program Advisory Team.
Communicate and advocate the mission of the National Observer Program and each regional observer program.
Develop and support national standards and policies to create high quality, cost effective, efficient, and productive observer programs.
Characterize and qualify the activities and resources of NOAA Fisheries observer programs and advocate for full support

Activities

Observer Providers

Data Usage
Scientific data are the foundation of fisheries management.  To manage fisheries, data are needed not only for species targeted by a fishery, but for all species in the ecosystem.  Observers are the only source of independent data collection for some types of at-sea information.  Bycatch, catch composition, and gear configuration cannot be seen otherwise.  This data are used to support the National Marine Fisheries Service in their effort for conservation and management activities.  These include:  Bycatch Reduction, Stock Assessment, Protected Species, Gear Research, and Fisheries Regulations.

Fisheries inspection programmes, conducted by officials with enforcement powers are not to be considered observer programmes. Though observers may be tasked to register compliance with fisheries regulations, observers do not have enforcement powers and are not to be considered enforcement agents.

In the United States, the National Oceanographic and Atmospheric Administration oversees the Domestic Observer program.

References

Wider reading
 Davies, S L and Reynolds, J E (2003) Guidelines for developing an at-sea fishery observer programme FAO Tech paper T414. 
 van Helvoort, Gus (1986) Observer Program Operations Manual FAO Tech paper T275. 
http://www.apo-observers.org/home
http://www.st.nmfs.noaa.gov/st4/nop/index.html
http://www.ifomc.com/

Anon. 2001. Proceedings of the Canada - US Fisheries Observer Program Workshop, June 26–29, 2000, St. John's Newfoundland. U.S. Dep. Commerce, Silver Spring, MD.
 Cornish, V; Didier, Alysius; Nance J; Tork M; Lafargue, J. ; Toner, M; Turk, T; Donahue, B; Rogers, B and Kulka, E David (eds.). 2004. Proceedings of the Third International Fisheries Observer Conference. NOAA Tech. Memo NMFS-F/SPO-64, U.S. Dep. Commerce, Silver Spring, MD.
 McElderry, H; Karp, W A; Twomey, J; Merklein, M; Cornish, V and Saunders, M. (1999) Proceedings of the first biennial Canada/U.S. observer program workshop, 113 p. NTIS No. PB99-146482.
 McVea, T A and Kennelly, S J (eds) (2005) Proceedings of the 4th International Fisheries Observer Conference, Sydney Australia, 8–11 November 2004. NSW Department of Primary Industries, Cronulla Fisheries Research Centre of Excellence, Cronulla, Australia.
 McVea, T A, and Kennelly, S J (eds) 2007. Proceedings of the 5th International Fisheries Observer Conference, 15–18 May 2007, Victoria, BC Canada. NSW Department of Primary Industries, Cronulla Fisheries Research Centre of Excellence, Cronulla, Australia.
 Davis K G and Quelch G D (2008) Observer Professionalism Working Group (OPWG) 5th International Fisheries Observer Conference (IFOC) Report. 87pp.

External links
 Association for Professional Observers (Association for Professional Observers)
 National Marine Fisheries Service: National Observer Program
 Fisheries Observer Conference (FOC)

Fisheries science